Vidarbha (Pronunciation: [ʋid̪əɾbʱə]) is a geographical region in the east of the Indian state of Maharashtra and a proposed state of western India, comprising the state's Amravati and Nagpur divisions. Amravati Division's former name is Berar (Varhad in Marathi). It occupies 31.6% of the total area and holds 21.3% of the total population of Maharashtra. It borders the state of Madhya Pradesh to the north, Chhattisgarh to the east, Telangana to the south and Marathwada and Uttar Maharashtra regions of Maharashtra to the west. Situated in central India. The largest city in Vidarbha is Nagpur followed by Amravati, Akola, Chandrapur and Gondia. A majority of Vidarbha residents speak Varhadi and Zadi dialects of Marathi.

The Nagpur region is known for growing oranges and cotton. Vidarbha holds two-thirds of Maharashtra's mineral resources and three-quarters of its forest resources, and is a net producer of power.

Throughout its history, Vidarbha has remained much calmer than the rest of India, especially during the communal troubles. However, there is considerable poverty and malnutrition. It is less economically prosperous compared to the rest of Maharashtra. The living conditions of farmers in this region are poor compared to India as a whole. There have been more than 200,000 farmers' suicides in Maharashtra in a decade, of which 70% being in the 11 districts of the Vidarbha region.

There have been recent calls for a separate state of Vidarbha, due to perceived neglect from the Government of Maharashtra and incompetent political leadership in Vidarbha. Being politically and financially distinct from the rest of Maharashtra, the calls for a separate state rose to prominence only when the leaders from this region were sidelined by other political leaders in recent years. Statehood demands have not been fulfilled mainly due to the opposition from the Shiv Sena, a major state political party.

History

Ancient period

Vidarbha was part of the Satavahana Empire/Andhra Empire (1st century BCE - 2nd century CE), as suggested by Satavahana coin finds in Pauni.

Medieval period

Nagpur was the capital of the Berar Subah, known as the Gulshan-e-Berar in the Medieval period, from the rule of the Khaljis to the Mughals, according to the Ain-i-Akbari and Alamgir Namah. In 1724, when Nizam-ul-Mulk Asaf Jah declared independence, the existence of Berar as a Mughal Subah came to an end. It became (though nominally) a part of Hyderabad State ruled by Nizams based in the present-day city of Hyderabad, through the right of collecting chauth were held by Maratha Empire.

Demand for separate statehood 
The Vidarbha region is in central India and is currently a part of the Maharashtra state. The Central Provinces legislature unanimously passed a resolution for the creation of the 'Mahavidarbha' state on 1 October 1938 at Nagpur.

Geography 

Vidarbha lies on the northern part of the Deccan Plateau. Unlike the Western Ghats, there are no major hilly areas. The Satpura Range lies to the north of Vidarbha region in Madhya Pradesh. The Melghat area of Amravati district is on the southern offshoot of the Satpura Range. Large basaltic rock formations exists throughout Vidarbha, part of the 66-million-year-old volcanic Deccan Traps. Bhandara and Gondia district are entirely occupied by metamorphic rock and alluvium, making their geology unique in Maharashtra.

The Poorna basin 
The Poorna basin lies in Western Vidarbha, and gets its name from Poorna river which flows through it. It comprises Akola, Amaravati and Buldhana districts of Vidarbha. The region has extremely high innate soil and water salinity, because of which it is often referred to as "kharpan patta" in Marathi. It means a high soil and water salinity.

Administration 
Vidarbha has 11 districts divided into two divisions (Amravati and Nagpur). 

Each district has a collector's office which is responsible for day-to-day administration. The District Collector is a Central Indian Government IAS appointee who is in charge of the governance of a district in a state.

Demographics 
Vidarbha has a total population of  according to the 2011 India census.

Religion 

Religion in Vidarbha is characterized by the diversity of religious beliefs and practices. Vidarbha possesses six of the world's major religions; namely Hinduism, Buddhism, Islam, Jainism, Christianity, and Sikhism.

According to the 2011 census, Hinduism was the principal religion in the state at 76.91% of the total population, while Buddhists constituted 13.08 of the total population. Vidarbha accounts for 45.91% of total Buddhists in Maharashtra.

Language and culture 

Hindu festivals like Holi, Diwali and Dasara are celebrated throughout the region. 

As per the 2011 census, 73.72% of the population speaks Marathi, 8.30% Hindi, 6.23% Urdu, 2.58% Lambadi, 1.83% Gondi, 1.10% Korku and 1.02% Telugu as their first language.

The Nagpur Central Museum ( 1863) maintains collections that are mainly from Vidarbha.

Economy 

Nagpur is a hub for business and healthcare. Amravati is known for film distributors and cloth markets. Yavatmal is a cotton city and is an exporter of cotton. Raymond UCO Denim Pvt. Ltd. is situated in Yavatmal. Chandrapur has a thermal power station which is one of the biggest in India and some other heavy industries such as paper (BILT Ballarpur), steel (MEL from Steel Authority of India), cement industries (UltraTech Cement, Ambuja Cements, ACC Limited, Manikgarh Cement, Murli Cement) and numerous coal mines.

MIHAN (Multi-modal International Cargo Hub and Airport at Nagpur) is an international cargo hub. MIHAN is for handling heavy cargo coming from South-East Asia and the Middle-East. The project also includes a  Special Economic Zone (SEZ) for information-technology companies.

Agriculture
 
Vidarbha has recently gained notoriety for the number of suicides committed by farmers.
On 1 July 2006 the Prime Minister of India Manmohan Singh announced a -crore (37.5 billion rupee) relief package for Vidarbha. The package is intended to help farmers in six districts of the region. However the package was not welcomed by most financial pundits and journalist P Sainath wrote in The Hindu that the package was destined to fail. Corruption was found amongst most of the officials involved with the packages and the government considered suspension of more than 400 officials in the scam.

Mineral wealth
Nagpur, Amravati, Yavatmal, Chandrapur, Gadchiroli, Bhandara  form the main mineral belt, with coal and manganese as the major minerals. Chandrapur district contributes 29% of all mineral output of Maharashtra. Iron ore and limestone are identified as potential mining resources.

Industry
Nagpur, Amravati, Akola,  Yavatmal, Wardha and Chandrapur are Large Industrial center in Vidarbha resp.
Ballarpur Industries, India's largest manufacturer and exporter of paper is located in Chandrapur district.

Education

Sports

Cricket is the most popular sport in the region and Nagpur's Vidarbha Cricket Association Ground (VCA) has hosted international cricket matches. It has been superseded by the Vidarbha Cricket Association Stadium, built in 2008 in Jamtha.

Tourism 

The eastern region of Vidarbha contains Maharashtra's oldest National Park, the Tadoba Andhari Tiger Reserve, one of India's 39 Project Tiger Reserves.
Tipeshwar Wildlife Sanctuary has large number of Tigers. 
Shegaon is a well known place of pilgrimage attributed to the Hindu Saint Gajanan Maharaj who lived in Shegaon and is worshipped across Maharashtra.
Chikhaldara in Amravati district is the only hill station in Vidarbha 

Ashti is a historical place famous for the participation in Indian independence movement and Tomb of Nawab Muhammad khan Niazi . People actively took part in Quit India Movement in 1942. Ashti is also known as shahidon ki Ashti which is located in vidharbha

In August 1942, Mr. Gandhi announced the start of Quit India Movement. In response to this, people from Ashti and its nearby villages decided to actively take part in the Quit India Movement on date of 16 August 1942.

In Mughal era, the Ashti was pergana under the guidance of Afghan Nobleman Nawab Muhammad Khan Niazi and his sons. His tomb and his son Nawab Ahmad Khan Niazi's tomb are located in Ashti.

Politics

Representation in Lok Sabha
Vidarbha is represented at the national level by 10 Lok Sabha seats. Nagpur district, which has the highest population density, is split into 2 Lok Sabha seats, Nagpur and Ramtek, while districts with lower population density like Chimur and Gadchiroli are clubbed together. Yavatmal-Washim is one of the most important seats in Vidharbha, as it includes 2 district headquarters. Ramtek and Amravati seats are reserved for Scheduled Caste candidates, while Gadchiroli-Chimur is reserved for Scheduled Tribes.

Representation in Vidhan Sabha
Vidarbha is represented at the state level by 62 Vidhan Sabha seats. Nagpur has the densest concentration of assembly seats with the city divided into 6 areas. Amravati, Akola and Yavatmal are some of the most important seats in Maharashtra. Certain seats are reserved for Scheduled Tribe candidates, while others are open to all. Pusad seat in Yavatmal District is also important as it has given 2 Chief Ministers to Maharashtra.

Separate statehood movement

Politician and economist Dr. Shrikant Jichkar opposed separation of Vidarbha from Maharashtra, believing that it was not sustainable: "If Vidarbha is hived off, we will have no funds from day one to run the new State. The region's share is burdened by a deficit and Monopoly Cotton Purchase Scheme, Employment Guarantee Scheme and such activity will immediately cease since we would not have money to pay salaries." He noted that income from available natural resources could not balance Mumbai's subsidies, and that Mumbai's cooperation was vital to any development—in addition to the societal risks of dividing the Marathi-speaking state.

See also
 Dehani lift irrigation scheme
 List of cities in Vidarbha
 List of Maratha dynasties and states
 Manav Vikas Mission
 Proposed states and territories of India

References

External links

 Article regarding environment of Vidarbha by Dr. Heda
 Tigertrails
National Park In Vidarbha
  This details the history of the province up to 1903, and itself cites  (Oxford, 1908)

 
Regions of India
Regions of Maharashtra
Proposed states and union territories of India